Podabrus pruinosus, the downy leather-winged beetle, is a species of soldier beetle in the family Cantharidae. It is found in North America.

Description and behavior 
Adults have a body length of 9-15 mm. They are orange with wing covers that are black-brown and covered in fine hair. They are common in spring and summer, when they feed on aphids. If disturbed, they will fall to the ground.

Larvae are 15-20 mm long, pink, with two dark lines on the thorax. They live in soil.

Subspecies
These five subspecies belong to the species Podabrus pruinosus:
 Podabrus pruinosus atrocervicus Fender, 1962
 Podabrus pruinosus comes
 Podabrus pruinosus diversipes Fall, 1927
 Podabrus pruinosus gradatus
 Podabrus pruinosus pruinosus

References

Further reading

External links

 

Cantharidae
Articles created by Qbugbot
Beetles described in 1851